This is a list of lakes of Armenia. Lake Sevan, in Gegharkunik Province, is the largest body of water in Armenia and the entire Caucasus region. 

Armenia has one very large lake called Lake Sevan and more than 100 small mountain lakes. None of them, except Sevan and Lake Arpi, have yet been extensively studied.

Within the country's capital, Yerevan, it is possible to find small lakes, often in amusement parks.

List

See also
 Geography of Armenia
 List of rivers of Armenia

References

lakes
Armenia